Schkeuditz is a Große Kreisstadt in the district of Nordsachsen, in Saxony, Germany. It is situated on the White Elster river, 12 km northwest of Leipzig. Leipzig/Halle Airport is located in Schkeuditz. The letter processing center for the greater Leipzig region is also located in Schkeuditz. "Schkeuditzer Kreuz", the first cloverleaf exchange in Germany was opened in 1936 and is today the intersection between the autobahns A9 and A14.

History

Schkeuditz was first documented in the year 981 as a church in Merseburg bishopric with the name "scudici".

Population over time 
The population development over time is given in the following table. Like many towns in east Germany, the population is lower today than just after reunification.

Annexations

References 

 
Nordsachsen